The Men's alpine combined competition at the 2017 World Championships was held on 13 February 2017.

Results
The downhill race was started at 10:00 and the slalom race at 13:00.

References

Men's super combined